Nicholas Griffith (c. 1573 – ?), of Plas Mawr, Caernarvonshire, was a Welsh Member of Parliament for Caernarvon Boroughs in 1601 and 1614.

References

1570s births
17th-century deaths
English MPs 1601
17th-century Welsh politicians
People from Caernarfonshire
Members of Parliament for Caernarfon
English MPs 1614